As of 2015, there is only one translation of the Tirukkural available in Swedish.

History of translations
The translation by Yngve Frykholm in 1971 is the only translation of the Tirukkural into Swedish. It was published under the title "Tirukkural sydindisk levnadsvisdom, statskunskap och kärlekskonst sammanfattad i 1330 epigram av tamilskalden Tiruvalluvar". It is a complete translation in prose.

Translations

See also
 Tirukkural translations
 List of Tirukkural translations by language

References

External links
 

Swedish
Translations into Swedish